Thomas Boutis (1922 – 2018) was an American artist, known as an abstract expressionist with a love of color. He primarily worked in painting, drawing, collage, watercolor, and printmaking.

Biography 
Tom Boutis was born in 1922 in New York City to parents from Kastoria, Greece. He worked as a Federal Art Project artist. Boutis was drafted by the United States Army in 1943. Boutis attended Cooper Union and graduated in 1948. He was a friend of Vincent DaCosta Smith and in the early 1950s Boutis influenced Smith's early career as an artist. His first solo art show was in January 1955 at Zabriskie Gallery in New York City. 

In the 1950s, with artists from the E 10th Street co-op movement, he established the Area Gallery in New York City which was in operation from 1958 until 1965. The original members of Area Gallery were Tom Boutis, alongside artists John Ireland Collins, Charles Steven DuBack, Joe Fiore, Bernard Langlais, Ed Moses, Daphne Mumford, and Paul Yakovenko. Alongside many of the artist from Area Gallery, Boutis was a founding member of the artist-run Landmark Gallery at 469 Broome Street in SoHo, in operation from 1972 until 1982.

Boutis was a National Academician and member of the National Academy of Design, joining in 1995. 

Boutis died on October 29, 2018 at the age of 96. 

His work is included in many public museum collections, including Art Institute of Chicago, the Solomon R. Guggenheim Museum archives, the Smithsonian Archives of American Art, among others.

References

Further reading

External links 
 Tom Boutis papers, 1951-1979, Archives of American Art, Smithsonian Institution

1922 births
2018 deaths
Abstract expressionist artists
Artists from New York City
Federal Art Project artists
Cooper Union alumni
National Academy of Design members
American people of Greek descent
United States Army personnel of World War II